The Bastard  is a 1954 Argentine film directed by Lucas Demare and starring Tita Merello. The film won two awards at the eleventh Silver Condor Awards: Best Director and Best Actress, for Merello.

Synopsis
A woman married to a sailor must raise her own son and also the one her husband had with another woman. The two children are quite different from each other: the woman's son is sickly, while the other one is strong. She is thus inclined to claim motherhood of the strong boy and switches their identities. However, her biological son dies in a shipwreck, and the woman's guilt leads her to commit suicide.

Cast

 Tita Merello
 Carlos Cores
 Julia Sandoval
 Enrique Chaico
 Margarita Corona
 Luis Medina Castro
 Néstor Deval
 Alberto Barcel
 Alejandro Rey
 Félix Rivero
 Antonia Volpe
 Orestes Soriani
 Carmen Giménez
 Aída Villadeamigo
 Francisco Audenino
 Mecha Corbo
 María Ferez
 Domingo Garibotto
 Ricardo Carenzo
 Juan Villarreal
 Elvira Quiroga

External links
 

1954 films
1950s Spanish-language films
Argentine black-and-white films
Argentine drama films
1954 drama films
Films directed by Lucas Demare
1950s Argentine films